"Drinkin' Thing" is a song written by Wayne Carson, and recorded by American country music singer Gary Stewart. It was released in May 1974 as the lead single from the album, Out of Hand. The song peaked at number 10 on the U.S. Billboard Hot Country Singles chart.

Chart performance

References

1974 singles
Gary Stewart (singer) songs
Songs written by Wayne Carson
1974 songs
RCA Records singles